2011 Archery European Indoor Championships is 13th edition of European Indoor Championships in Archery which was held in Cambrils, Spain between 21–27 March 2011.

Senior Results

Men

Women

Junior Results

Participated countries 
25 take part in elite competition. Some countries also send archers, officials and judges, but they participated only in junior events.

 (4)
 (1)
 (1)
 (3)
 (4)
 (9)
 (3)
 (7)
 (7)
 (3)
 (3)
 (2)
 (3)
 (12)
 (1)
 (3)
 (3)
 (10)
 (4)
 (7)
 (11)
 (3)
 (5)
 (1)
 (12)

References 

2011 in archery
2011 in Spanish sport
European Archery Championships
International archery competitions hosted by Spain